Len Rawle, MBE, (born 1938 in Tonypandy) is a Welsh organ builder and organist. A London College of Music graduate, he is particularly noted for his restoration of Wurlitzer theatre organs. In 1973 he appeared in Metro-Land, contributing Chattanooga Choo Choo. Rawle has given numerous concerts and workshops in the USA, Australia and Europe. In May 2001 he played on "Western New York's mightiest Wurlitzer theater pipe organ" in Buffalo. In Metroland Rawle actually plays The Varsity Drag, a song which would have been popular when Betjeman was a young man.

Rawle was made an MBE in 2012. He often played at the Barry Memorial Hall in Barry, Vale of Glamorgan. He currently maintains the Wurlitzer organ in Woking and has previously maintained several other Wurlitzer organs such as the Gaumont State Kilburn and the former Empire Leicester Square Wurlitzer, which he installed in his Chorleywood home. He was also involved in a £40,000 project restore the Granada Tooting Wurlitzer organ, described as "one of the most significant restoration projects in the UK".

References

External links
British Pathé newsreel about Rawle, 1960

Welsh organists
British male organists
1938 births
Living people
People from Tonypandy
Organ builders of the United Kingdom
Members of the Order of the British Empire
21st-century organists
21st-century British male musicians